Jawalamukhi, also Jawalaji, is a Shakti Pitha town and a nagar parishad in Kangra district in the Indian state of Himachal Pradesh. Hindu genealogy registers are kept here like that of Haridwar. The Hindi word 'Jwalamukhi' literally means 'Volcano' in English.

Geography
It has an average elevation of 610 metres (2,001 feet).

Demographics
At the 2001 India census, Jawalamukhi had a population of 4931. Males constitute 52% of the population and females 48%.

Area profile of Jawalamukhi town 

 India census,

 Number of Households - 1,012
 Average Household Size (per Household) - 5.0
 Population-Total - 4,931
 Population-Urban - 4,931
 Proportion of Urban Population (%) - 100
 Population-Rural - 0
 Sex Ratio - 906
 Population (0-6 Years) - 608
 Sex Ratio (0-6 Year) - 961
 SC Population - 812
 Sex Ratio (SC) - 961
 Proportion of SC (%) - 16.0
 ST Population - 0
 Sex Ratio (ST) - 0
 Proportion of ST (%) - 0
 Literates - 3,777
 Illiterates - 1,154
 Literacy Rate (%)

Jwalamukhi Devi Temple

The temple is a famous shrine to the goddess Jwalamukhi, considered to be an incarnation of the goddess Adi Parashakti, also known as Durga or Kali. The temple is regarded as one of the 51 Shakti Peethas. History says that the ruling king, Raja Bhumi Chand Katoch of Kangra, a great devotee of the goddess Durga, dreamt of the sacred place and the king sent people to find the whereabouts of the site. The site was traced and the Raja built a temple at that location. The present shrine consists of a gold-gilded dome, various pinnacles and a silver entrance door. The temple is located within the Dhauladhar mountain range. The goddess Jwalamukhi is worshipped as an eternal flame that emerges from a small fissure in a rock inside the sanctum sanctorum. Nine flames, symbolising the Navadurgas, are believed to be worshipped in the shrine. It is unknown when the flames have been burning and from where the flames emerged. Scientists predicted that an underground volcano exists beneath the temple and the volcano's natural gas burns through the rock as the flames. Akbar, emperor of the Mughal dynasty, once tried to extinguish the flames by covering them with an iron disk and even channelizing water to them. But the flames blasted all these efforts. Akbar then presented a golden parasol (chhatri) at the shrine. However, the parasol fell suddenly and the gold formed another metal that is still unknown to the world. His belief in the deity was all the more strengthened after this incident. Thousands of pilgrims visit the shrine around the year to satisfy their spiritual urges.

The temple is located on a small spur on the Dharamsala-Shimla road at a distance of about 20 km from the Jawalamukhi Road Railway Station and attracts hundreds of thousands of pilgrims every year. There is a small platform in front of the temple and a big mandapa where a huge brass bell presented by the King of Nepal is hung. Usually, milk and water are offered to the deity and abhisheka is offered to the sacred flames in the pit.

The prasada of the deity is Bhog made of Rabri or thickened milk, Misri or candy, seasonal fruits, and milk. There is a Sri Yantra in front of the flame, which is covered with, shawls, and ornaments. The puja has different 'phases' and goes on practically the whole day. Aarti is performed five times in the day, havan is performed once daily and portions of Durga Saptasati are recited. For Aarti, the temple remains open from 11.00 A.M. to 12.00 P.M. and from 06.00 P.M. to 07.00 P.M. 

Maharaja Ranjit Singh paid a visit to the temple in 1815 and the dome of the temple was gold-plated by him. Just a few feet above the Jwalamukhi temple there is a six-feet deep pit with a circumference of about three feet. At the bottom of this pit, there is another small pit about one and a half feet deep with hot water bubbling all the time.

The temple is identified as one among the 51 Shakti Peethas. It is also one of the most renowned temples of Goddess Durga.

Genealogy registers
Hindu genealogy registers at Jawalamukhi are the genealogy registers of pilgrims maintained there by pandas.

The Jawalamukhi shrine as a Shakti Peeth

The shrine is regarded as a Maha Shakti Peetham. It is believed that Sati Devi's tongue fell here. Shakti Peethas are shrines of Devi, the primordial Mother Goddess. Each Shakti Peetha has a shrine for the Shakti and Bhairava. Siddhida (Ambika)is the Shakti and Unmatta Bhairava is the Kalabhairava. The Daksha yaga and Sati's self immolation had immense significance in shaping the ancient Sanskrit literature and even had impact on the culture of India. It led  to the development of the concept of Shakti Peethas and there by strengthening Shaktism. Enormous stories in puranas took the Daksha yaga as the reason for its origin. It is an important incident in Shaivism resulting in the emergence of Shree Parvati in the place of Sati Devi and making Shiva a grihastashrami (house holder).

References

 Cities and towns in Kangra district
Hindu temples